Anthony Gobert (born 5 March 1975 in Greenacre, New South Wales, Australia) is a former professional motorcycle road racer, nicknamed The Go Show. He was a rider of immense promise and talent who had his career derailed by a personal struggle with drug abuse. Winning the final leg of the 1994 season at Philip Island, he became the youngest ever World Superbike race winner at the age of 19 years old, a record that was improved by 18-year-old Yuichi Takeda at Sugo in 1996. Gobert won that race at Phillip Island from Pole and is still (2020) the youngest rider (19 years, 7 months and 26 days) to do that.

Superbikes/Supersport

In his teens he was a successful motocross racer, winning national classes in Australia, before moving to road racing and winning the Australian domestic superbike championship.

For 1998 and 1999 he competed in the AMA Superbike Championship on a Vance & Hines Ducati, with some success, including a win as a WSBK wildcard at Laguna Seca. A win in the second race was within reach, until an unforced crash at the final turn, onto the main straight. The second race was won by his teammate Ben Bostrom.

For  he returned to WSBK on a Bimota SB8R. With the race number 501, he won a wet race at Philip Island and generally did better than expected on the machine, before the team folded, due to lack of financial backing. Bimota named the SB8K Gobert bike after him. Three British Superbike meetings (substituting for Steve Hislop at Team Virgin Mobile Yamaha) followed in late 2000.

For 2001 he was back in the AMA championship with Yamaha, spending two years racing the YZF R7 in the superbike class and the YZF R6 in the supersport class respectively. This was followed with a brief dalliance with Ducati in 2003. In , he raced at the Valencia Superbike World Championship round (making him the first rider to have wildcard rides in three different countries), alongside some rounds of Spain's Superbike series. For 2007 he returned to Australia Superbikes on a Kawasaki.

Grand Prix

He went to the 500cc World Championship in 1997 with the Lucky Strike Suzuki replacing Scott Russell as the number one rider, but was dismissed in mid-season after failing a drug test.

He raced for  MuZ Weber at the end of 1999 season

A 500cc one-off at Donington Park for Kenny Roberts' KR3 Modenas Team followed in late 2000.

Career results

Grand Prix motorcycle racing

Races by year
(key) (Races in bold indicate pole position, races in italics indicate fastest lap)

Superbike World Championship

Races by year
(key) (Races in bold indicate pole position) (Races in italics indicate fastest lap)

Supersport World Championship

Races by year
(key) (Races in bold indicate pole position, races in italics indicate fastest lap)

Personal life
According to a report in the Courier Mail, the 33-year-old Gobert was charged with two counts of stealing after taking two $20 bills from the hand of a 70-year-old man at a Coles supermarket in Surfers Paradise on 13 May 2008 and stealing a woman's purse the following day. He was granted bail on condition that he surrender his passport, report to police five times a week and not enter central Surfers Paradise.

In June 2019 Gobert was reported to have been involved in an altercation at a restaurant. Afterwards he was followed home by number of individuals whom he'd earlier fought with. They forced their way into Gobert's home and beat him with batons. He was beaten so badly that doctors could not recognise him, and was also robbed; after he regained consciousness hospital staff were able to internet-search his background and contacted relatives.

References

Career details from mcnews

1975 births
Sportsmen from New South Wales
Motorcycle racers from Sydney
Australian motorcycle racers
Superbike World Championship riders
500cc World Championship riders
British Superbike Championship riders
AMA Superbike Championship riders
Australian sportspeople in doping cases
Doping cases in motorcycle racing
Supersport World Championship riders
Living people